Dragon Cove is a 550 m wide cove indenting for 600 m the northeast coast of Varna Peninsula, Livingston Island  in the South Shetland Islands, Antarctica entered between Sigritsa Point and Ficheto Point.  Surmounted by Sayer Nunatak on the southwest.  The area was visited by early 19th century sealers.

The feature is named after the brig Dragon (Captain McFarlane) of Liverpool, which visited the South Shetland Islands in 1820–21.

Location

See also
 Varna Peninsula
 Livingston Island

Maps
 L.L. Ivanov et al. Antarctica: Livingston Island and Greenwich Island, South Shetland Islands. Scale 1:100000 topographic map. Sofia: Antarctic Place-names Commission of Bulgaria, 2005.
 L.L. Ivanov. Antarctica: Livingston Island and Greenwich, Robert, Snow and Smith Islands. Scale 1:120000 topographic map.  Troyan: Manfred Wörner Foundation, 2009.

References
 SCAR Composite Antarctic Gazetteer.

Coves of Livingston Island